The Montague–Court Building is a 35-story,  tall commercial office tower at 16 Court Street in Downtown Brooklyn, New York City. It was designed by architect H. Craig Severance and built in 1927. It is the tallest office building and the twelfth tallest building overall in Brooklyn at 462 feet (141 m). The Montague–Court Building has been owned and managed by the CIM Group since 2017, when CIM purchased the structure from SL Green Realty for $171 million. In February 2012, the New York City Landmarks Preservation Commission designated the building as part of the Borough Hall Skyscraper Historic District.

See also
 List of tallest buildings in Brooklyn
 List of tallest buildings in New York City

References

External links

 
 
 
 

1920s architecture in the United States
1927 establishments in New York City
Art Deco architecture in Brooklyn
Art Deco skyscrapers
Brooklyn Heights
Commercial buildings in Brooklyn
Downtown Brooklyn
Office buildings completed in 1927
Skyscraper office buildings in New York City
Skyscrapers in Brooklyn